Victor Cohen Hadria (born 1949) is a French writer.

Biography 
Victor Cohen Hadria was the director of the medical broadcasts of Igor Barrère and various fictions for television. He was also a winegrower and oenologist for six years in a property of Doganella de Ninfa in Lazio, Italy. In Les Trois saisons de la rage that gives voice to a Norman physician of the nineteenth century "he brilliantly built, in a language of pure classicism, a great fresco of the rural society of the XIXth."

Works 
1997: Isaac était leur nom, short stories, Albin Michel, 
1998: Chronique des quatre horizons, short stories,  Albin Michel, 
2010 Les Trois Saisons de la rage, novel, Albin Michel, 
2017: Maîtres du monde, novel,  Albin Michel, -

Prizes 
1997: Prix de la nouvelle du Salon du livre du Le Mans
2010: Prix du premier roman for Les Trois Saisons de la rage.
2011: Prix des libraires for Les Trois Saisons de la rage.
2011: Prix littéraire de la ville de Caen for Les Trois Saisons de la Rage

References

External links 
 Victor Cohen Hadria - Les Trois Saisons de la rage on YouYube
 Victor Cohen-Hadria, Les trois saisons de la rage on Cahiers d'histoire
 Les Trois Saisons de la rage, Victor Cohen-Hadria on Le Livre de Poche
 Victor Cohen Hadria on Babelio

Prix des libraires winners
Prix du premier roman winners
20th-century French novelists
20th-century French male writers
21st-century French novelists
1949 births
Living people
21st-century French male writers